Holy Trinity Church, Kirton is a Grade II* listed parish church in the Church of England in Kirton, Nottinghamshire.

History
The church dates from the 13th century and was restored in 1865.

The lychgate and churchyard wall are Grade II listed.

References

Church of England church buildings in Nottinghamshire
Grade II* listed churches in Nottinghamshire